Sanfrecce Hiroshima is a Japanese professional football club based in Asaminami-ku, Hiroshima. The club plays in the J1 League, which is the top tier of football in the country. Sanfrecce is one of the most successful clubs in Japan. The club is the joint fourth in most J1 League titles with four, the joint first in most top-flight titles (which includes the defunct Japan Soccer League), with eight, and the club with the most participations in Emperor's Cup finals, with 15.

The club is one of the only four clubs to be among the three best-placed teams of the FIFA Club World Cup, in a feat currently shared with Al-Sadd, Al-Ain and Kashima Antlers.

Club name
The club name is a portmanteau of the Japanese word for three, San and the Italian word frecce, which means 'arrows'. This is based on the story of the feudal lord Mōri Motonari who told his three sons that while a single arrow might be easily snapped, three arrows held together would not be broken and urged them to work for the good of the clan and its retainers.

Former names
 1938–70: 
 1943–46: Football was suspended during the period, due to the Pacific War.
 1971–80: 
 1981–83: 
 1984–85: 
 1986–92:

Location
The club's home town is Hiroshima and the side plays at Hiroshima Big Arch and Hiroshima Prefectural Stadium. It holds training sessions at Yoshida Soccer Park in Akitakata, Hiroshima and Hiroshima 1st Ball Park.

Sanfrecce plans a move to a new stadium on 2024, which has been named Hiroshima Peace Stadium Park. It is on construction since 2021, and is scheduled to end it around the end of 2023.

History

As Mazda team

The club was an original founder ("Original Eight") of the now-disbanded Japan Soccer League (JSL) in 1965. They dominated the JSL's early years, winning the title 4 times in a row – a feat that was later equaled by Yomiuri SC/Verdy Kawasaki. When JSL disbanded and became the J.League in 1992, it dropped the company name and became "Sanfrecce Hiroshima". Alongside JEF United Ichihara Chiba and Urawa Red Diamonds they co-founded both leagues ("Original Ten").

During the 1969 season they participated in the Asian Club Cup, forerunner to today's AFC Champions League; at the time, the tournament was done in a single locale (in that year it was Bangkok, Thailand), and they ended up in third place, the first participation of a Japanese club in the continental tournament. This also cost them the league title to Mitsubishi/Urawa, and although they won another title in 1970, since then the club has been out of the running for the title, with exceptional seasons such as 1994 when they won runner-up.

1960s
The Toyo Industries that became the first JSL champions also completed the first double by taking the Emperor's Cup. They were also the first of three "Invincibles", undefeated champion clubs in Japan (the others were Mitsubishi in 1969 and Yamaha in 1987–88), although only Toyo completed a double.

Matsumoto, Ogi, and Yasuyuki Kuwahara went on to win the 1968 Olympic bronze medal for the national team.

2000s

In 2002, Sanfrecce became the first former stage winner (first stage, 1994) to be relegated to the lower division, J2. But it only spent a year there, finishing second the very next season to regain promotion back to J1. The club finished 16th in the 2007 season and were relegated to J.League Division 2 after they were beaten by Kyoto Sanga in the promotion/relegation play-off. In 2008 they nevertheless won the J2 title at the first attempt, having 84 points (a difference of 25 points with the runner-up clubs) with six matches left.

By virtue of earning fourth place in the 2009 season and Gamba Osaka retaining the Emperor's Cup, Sanfrecce qualified for the Asian Champions League, where they were knocked out in the group phase.

On 24 November 2012, Sanfrecce defeated Cerezo Osaka 4–1 to seal their first ever J.League Division 1 title.

On 7 December 2013, Sanfrecce defeated Kashima Antlers 2–0, securing their second J.League Division 1 title following a thrilling finish to the season which saw first-place Yokohama F. Marinos losing their final league game, handing Sanfrecce the title. With their second consecutive title win, Sanfrecce became the second club to successfully defend their crown since Kashima Antlers in 2009.

2015 proved to be a great year for Sanfrecce, finishing 1st in the 2nd half of the season, then finishing 1st overall, just 2 points above Urawa Red Diamonds, to qualify and represent Japan in that year's FIFA Club World Cup. They would finish 3rd, after winning, 2–1, against Chinese side Guanzhou Evergrande in the 3rd place match.

In 2018, after Sanfrecce progessively trailing towards a J1 title, as it led the standings after Round 5, the club fell down to 2nd-place at the end of the season. The club saw Kawasaki Frontale win the league as Sanfrecce lost four of their last five league matches.

In 2022, the club was relieved to experience another good season, under the management of newly-appointed German coach Michael Skibbe. Underrated by many because of the previous season, the club fought for the title at every competition it played until the very end. The Violas finished 3rd place at the J1 League, as runners-up to J2 club Ventforet Kofu in the Emperor's Cup final, and as J.League Cup champions. The J.League Cup was won in dramatic fashion against Cerezo Osaka, as the club managed to comeback from a 1–0 loss with two goals scored by mid-season Cypriot signing Pieros Sotiriou. Both goals came very late in the match, being scored at the 96th and 101st minute of the match, during the added time of the second half. For his efforts to make the team competitive at every competition Sanfrecce partook in, Skibbe won J.League Manager of the Year, the club's 4th Manager of the Year title.

Kit and colours

Colours
The main colour of Sanfrecce Hiroshima is purple.

Kit evolution

Record as J.League member 

Key
 Pos. = Position in league
 Attendance/G = Average home league attendance
 † 2020 & 2021 seasons attendances reduced by COVID-19 worldwide pandemic
Source: J.League Data Site

League history
 Division 1 (Japan Soccer League Div. 1): 1965–1983 (as Toyo 1965–1980, as Mazda 1981–)
 Division 2 (Japan Soccer League Div. 2): 1984–1985
 Division 1 (Japan Soccer League Div. 1): 1986/87–1987/88
 Division 2 (Japan Soccer League Div. 2): 1988/89–1990/91
 Division 1 (Japan Soccer League Div. 1): 1991/92
 Division 1 (J.League Div. 1): 1993–2002 (as Sanfrecce Hiroshima)
 Division 2 (J.League Div. 2): 2003
 Division 1 (J.League Div. 1): 2004–2007
 Division 2 (J.League Div. 2): 2008
 Division 1 (J.League Div. 1): 2009–present

Total (as of 2022): 51 seasons in the top tier and 7 seasons in the second tier.

Honours
As Toyo Kogyo SC and Mazda SC (amateur era) as well as Sanfrecce Hiroshima (professional era)

League
Japan Soccer League/J1 League
 Champions (8): 1965, 1966, 1967, 1968, 1970, 2012, 2013, 2015
J2 League
 Champions (1): 2008

Cups
Emperor's Cup
Winners (3): 1965, 1967, 1969
J.League Cup
Winners (1): 2022
Japanese Super Cup
 Winners (4):  2008, 2013, 2014, 2016
 All Japan Works Football Championship 
 Winners (2): 1956, 1962
 NHK Super Cup 
Winners (1): 1967

Continental record

Personnel awards
Domestic
J.League Player of the Year
  Hisato Satō (2012)
  Toshihiro Aoyama (2015)
J.League Top Scorer
  Hisato Satō (2012)
J.League Best Eleven
 Takuya Takagi (1994)
 Hisato Satō (2005, 2012)
 Tomoaki Makino (2010)
 Hiroki Mizumoto (2012)
 Shusaku Nishikawa (2012, 2013)
 Toshihiro Aoyama (2012, 2013, 2015)
 Yojiro Takahagi (2012)
 Tsukasa Shiotani (2014, 2015)
 Douglas (2015)
J.League Rookie of the Year
 Kazuyuki Morisaki (2000)
 Takuma Asano (2015)
J.League Cup New Hero Award
 Yojiro Takahagi (2010)
J.League Manager of the Year
 Hajime Moriyasu (2012, 2013, 2015)
 Michael Skibbe (2022)

International
FIFA Club World Cup Top Scorer
  Hisato Satō (2012)
FIFA Puskás Award nominee
  Hisato Satō (2014)

Players

Current squad

Type 2
Type 2
Type 2

Out on loan

Reserve squad (U-18s)
.

Club staff
For the 2023 season.

Managers

Notes

References

External links

 

 
Mazda
1938 establishments in Japan
Association football clubs established in 1992
Football clubs in Japan
Sports teams in Hiroshima
J.League clubs
Japan Soccer League clubs
Emperor's Cup winners
Japanese League Cup winners